This is a list of Syrian people. Entries on this list are demonstrably notable by having a linked current article or reliable sources as footnotes against the name to verify they are notable and identify themselves as Syrian, naturalized as Syrian or were registered at birth as Syrian.

Leaders and politicians

Ancient 

 Elagabalus Roman emperor
 Severus Alexander Roman emperor, was the son of Julia Mamaea 
Philip the Arab Roman emperor
 Julia domna Roman empress and mother of Geta and Caracalla
Eutropia Roman Princess, mother of emperor Maxentius and two queens Fausta and Flavia, and the grandmother of Constantine II, Constans and Constantius II and the great grandmother of Julian and Constantius Gallus
Leo III the Syrian Byzantine emperor and the founder of the Syrian dynasty
Constantine V Byzantine emperor father of Leo IV the Khazar and grandfather of Constantine VI
Leo V the Armenian Byzantine emperor of Armenian and Syrian origins.
Cassiodorus  Consul of the Roman Empire, sometimes called the savior of the western civilization
Avidius Cassius  usurping Roman emperor for three months in AD 175.
Leontius (usurper)
Tiberius Claudius Pompeianus  Council and military commander, second spouse of Lucilla, and father of Pompeianus
Minervina wife of Constantine the Great, mother of the Roman emperor Crispus
Mamertina Concubine of Emperor Licinius and mother of Licinius II
Sextus Varius Marcellus was the spouse of Julia Soaemias, he was also  praefectus of the military treasury and governor of Numedia

Modern and contemporary 
Ibrahim Hananu – leader of the revolution (northern area) against French Mandate (1921–1929)
Shukri al-Quwatli – former President
Hashim al-Atassi – former President
Nazim al-Kudsi – former President
Rushdi al-Kikhya – statesman and political leader
Fares al-Khoury – statesman and former prime minister
Hafez al-Assad – former President
Abdul Halim Khaddam – former President and former Vice President
Subhi Barakat – former President
Lu'ay al-Atassi – former President
Nureddin al-Atassi – former President
Haqqi al-Azm – former prime minister
Khalid al-Azm – former prime minister
Maarouf al-Dawalibi – former prime minister
Sultan al-Atrash – General of the Great Syrian Revolution
Yusuf al-Azmah – former Minister of Defense
Rashad Barmada – former Minister of Defense
Bashir Azmeh – former prime minister
Mikhail Ilyan – former Minister of Foreign Affairs
Husni al-Za'im – former president
Amin al-Hafiz – former president
Ahmed Kuftaro – former Grand Mufti of Syria, 1964–2004
Carlos Menem – former President of Argentina
Gabi Ashkenazi – Israeli politician and former military leader
Levon Ter-Petrosyan - first president of Armenia
Mitch Daniels – 49th Governor of Indiana 
Victor Atiyeh – 32nd Governor of Oregon  
Robert Cahaly – political consultant and  founder of the Trafalgar Group
Avichay Adraee – Lieutenant Colonel in the Israel Defense Forces
Muhammad Mustafa Mero – former prime minister
Muhammad Naji al-Otari – prime minister
Mahmoud Zuabi – former prime minister
Farouq al-Sharaa – diplomat, former foreign minister from 1984 to 2006 and vice-president since 2006
Tareck El Aissami – Venezuelan Syrian politician serving as Minister of Industries and National Production since 14 June 2018
Khalil Eideh – Australian politician

Scholars

Modern and contemporary 
Raphael of Brooklyn – Damascene Syrian parents; first Orthodox bishop to be consecrated in North America
Jerrier A. Haddad – co-developer and designer of the IBM 701 series which was IBM’s first commercial scientific computer and its first mass produced mainframe computer
Hunein Maassab – professor of epidemiology known for developing the Live attenuated influenza vaccine
Shadia Habbal – astronomer and physicist; played a key role in establishing the NASA Parker Solar Probe
Fawwaz T. Ulaby – professor of electrical engineering and computer science at the University of Michigan; received the IEEE Edison Medal in 2006
Kefah Mokbel, FRCS – lead breast surgeon at the London Breast Institute of The Princess Grace Hospital; professor of Breast Cancer Surgery (The Brunel Institute of Cancer Genetics and Pharmacogenomics) Brunel University London
Oussama Khatib – roboticist and professor of Computer Science at Stanford University; received the IEEE RAS for Distinguished Service Award (2013)

Dina Katabi – director of the Massachusetts Institute of Technology Wireless Center
Huda Akil – neuroscientist, past President of the Society for Neuroscience
Malatius Jaghnoon – epigrapher and founder of the archaeological society in Homs
Afif Bahnassi – art historian and curator
Constantine Zureiq – historian and activist
Aref Dalila – economist, political activist and former political prisoner

Writers, poets and authors
Hanna Diyab
Ziad Abdullah – novelist and screenwriter
Nasib Arida
Mary Ajami
Sadiq Jalal al-Azm – author, philosopher, sociologist and human rights advocate
Hussam Mtawa – famous port, but moved to Albania during the war
Ali Ahmad Said Esber – popularly known as Adonis, a Syrian poet, essayist and translator
Aziz Azmeh – author and philosopher
Abdulkarim Baderkhan (born 1986) – poet, translator, critic
Morad Daoud – novelist, sculptor
Hisham al-Ghazzi (born 1923) – lawyer
Abd al-Masih Haddad
Qustaki al-Himsi
Adib Ishaq
Riad Ismat – writer, director
Amal Kassir – spoken word poet
Khaled Khalifa – novelist
Mohammed Maghout – poet and writer
Francis Marrash
Abu Khalil Qabbani – playwright, "father of Syrian theatre"
Nizar Qabbani – poet
Widad Sakakini (1913–1991) – writer and feminist
Fathallah Saqqal – lawyer, writer, government minister
Mona Simpson (born 1957) – Syrian American novelist and essayist
Zakariyya Tamer – writer
 Muhammad al-Tunji – linguist, and author; received Indian Prize from UNESCO in 1970
Dima Wannous – author and journalist
Saadallah Wannous – playwright
Khairy Alzahaby – writer, novelist, scenarist, historian, thinker
Riad Sattouf – cartoonist, comic artist, film director

Miscellaneous 
Michel Aflaq – political theorist
Vatche Arslanian – International Red Cross
Tawfiq Bay – traveler, military leader, and politician
Muzna Dureid – activist
Aref Dalila – economist, Damascus Spring figure
Hala Gorani – reporter
Sireen Hamsho – renewable energy specialist
Abdul-Nabi Isstaif – critic, scholar of comparative literature and Orientalism
Sami Zayn – professional wrestler
Steve Jobs – founder of Apple, Inc.
Jerrier A. Haddad – co-developer and designer of the IBM 701

Ahmad Joudeh – ballet dancer
Jack Marshall – poet and author

Businesspeople 

 Jacques Saadé – billionaire with a net worth of $7 billion   
 Rodolphe Saadé – billionaire with a net worth of $10.9 billion 
 Jose Mugrabi – billionaire with a net worth of $5 billion.
 David Nahmad – billionaire and former art dealer
 Ezra Nahmad  – billionaire art collector and dealer
 Edmond Safra – banker
 Ayman Asfari – Chief Executive of Petrofac
 Jacob Safra – banker
 Joseph Safra – banker
 Jeff Sutton – billionaire New York real estate developer and the founder of Wharton Properties
 Michel Chalhoub – founder of the Chalhoub Group
 Mohed Altrad – French-Syrian businessman
 Mohammed Mohiedin Anis 
 Elie Horn – billionaire
 Isaac Saba Raffoul – billionaire
 Gilbert Bigio – wealthiest man in Haiti
 Ronaldo Mouchawar – entrepreneur, founder of Souq.com 
 Sam Yagan – Internet entrepreneur
 Wafic Said – established the Saïd Foundation in 1982 and the Saïd Business School at the University of Oxford in 1996
 Omar Hamoui – entrepreneur and the founder of AdMob, has a net worth of $300 million
 George Haswani – businessman who owns the HESCO natural gas production company

Actors/actresses 
Yasser Azmeh – comedian and director
Abbas al-Noury – actor
Samer al-Masry – actor
Bassam Kousa – actor
Mounir Fakhry Abdel Nour – actor
Muna Wassef – actress
Lilia al-Atrash – actress
Bouthayna Shaya – actress
Marwan Farhat – actor
Raghda Khateb – actress
Ayman Al-Salek – actor
Adel Abo Hassoon – actor
Jumana Murad – actress
Anjy Al-Yousif – actress
Yahya Al-Kafri – actor
Hisham Kafarneh – actor
Ahmad Harhash – actor

Archaeologists
 Khaled al-Asaad – former director of antiquities in Palmyra, brutally beheaded by Daesh
Raoul Gregory Vitale – born in Latakia

Architects
 Nazih Kawakibi – architect, professor of architecture and historian of Damascus
 Yousef Abdelky – Sheikh Zayed Mosque designer
 Khaled Malas – architect and art historian
 Moshe Safdie  – designer of Marina Bay Sands and Jewel Changi Airport
 Apollodorus of Damascus – Roman architect, 2nd century

Artists 
Youssef Abdelke – artist 
Darin Ahmad – artist, poet, writer
Ali Farzat – cartoonist
Marwan Kassab-Bachi – painter
Louay Kayali – cartoonist
Fateh Moudarres – painter

Athletes
Flamma – one of the most famous gladiators in history 
Joseph Atiyeh – wrestler and silver medalist at the 1984 Olympic Games
Zid Abou Hamed – athlete
Mustafa Hamsho – boxer
Ahed Joughili – weightlifter
Michael Madanly – basketball player
Naser Al Shami – boxer
Feras Saied – bodybuilder
Yasser Seirawan – chess grandmaster and four-time US-champion
Ghada Shouaa – heptathlete and gold medalist at the 1996 Olympic Games
Yaser Shigan – boxer
Sami Zayn – wrestler

Footballers 
Omar Al Somah
Firas Al Khatib
Jehad Al Hussain
Mahmoud_Al-Mawas
Wael Ayan
Aatef Jenyat
Sanharib Malki
Ilyas Merkes
Louay Chanko
George Mourad
Christer Youssef
Abdul Fattah Al Agha
Basel Abdoulfattakh
Dani Kiki
Gaby Jallo
Imad Chhadeh
Ninos Gouriye
Ibrahim Alma
Zyad_Chaabo
Oliver Kass Kawo

Criminals 
Monzer al-Kassar – international arms dealer
Akram Ojjeh – international arms dealer, former son-in-law of Mustafa Tlass

Film directors 
Moustapha Akkad
Omar Amiralay 
Talal Derki 
Mohammad Malas 
Ossama Mohammed
Abdellatif Abdelhamid

Musicians
Bob Marley – born to a family of Syrian Jewish origin
Asmahan – original name: Princess Amal Al Atrash, singer, sister of Farid Al Atrash
Farid al-Atrash – composer, singer and oud player
Fahd ballan – traditional singer
Kinan Azmeh – musician
Sabah Fakhri – traditional singer
Malek Jandali – composer and pianist
Assala Nasri – singer
George Wassouf – singer
Bachar Zarkan – musician, singer, actor
Lena Chamamyan – singer
Rasha Risk – singer
Mayada El Hennawy – singer
XXXTentacion – born to a family of possibly Syrian origin; rapper, singer, songwriter

Former political prisoners and prisoners of conscience
Ali al-Abdallah – writer and human rights activist
Michel Kilo – writer, political prisoner
Haytham Manna – writer, spent three decades as a human rights activist
Haitham al-Maleh – human rights activist and former judge
Riad al-Turk – prominent Syrian opposition leader, former political prisoner for about 20 years in Syria

See also 
 List of people by nationality
 List of Arab Americans
 List of Syrian artists

References 

Lists of Arabs